Col. Frederick Henry Rich (8 March 1824 – 22 August 1904) was a British soldier, who served with the Royal Engineers and was the Chief Inspecting Officer of the Railway Inspectorate between 1885 and 1889. He investigated many of the major railway accidents in the late 19th century, including those at Staplehurst in 1865, in which the author Charles Dickens was involved, and at Norton Fitzwarren in 1890.

Family
Rich was born on 8 March 1824 at Woodlands, Castleconnell near Limerick in Ireland, the son of John Sampson Rich (1789–1880) and Amelia née Whitfield (1801–1883).

Military history
Gentleman Cadet Frederick Henry Rich joined the Corps of Royal Engineers as a second lieutenant on 11 January 1843. He was promoted to first lieutenant on 1 April 1846, to second captain on 17 February 1854 and to first captain on 23 February 1856.

During his early years with the Royal Engineers he had various postings in England, including Chatham, Woolwich, Devonport and Dover. He was posted to Ireland for a year in 1845, before being posted to Canada and then to the West Indies from August 1847 to January 1851. Between April 1851 and May 1859 he returned to Ireland followed by two years in Malta.

In April 1861, he was seconded to the Board of Trade as an Inspector of Railways, remaining in this post until October 1872, when he spent the last four months before his retirement at the War Office.

He was further promoted to brevet major on 24 August 1866 and to lieutenant-colonel on 8 May 1867. He retired on full pay on 1 February 1873 with the honorary rank of colonel.

Inspector of Railways

Rich was initially seconded to the Board of Trade as an Inspector of Railways in 1861 but continued in this post after his retirement from the Royal Engineers, serving as Chief Inspecting Officer of the Railway Inspectorate between 1885 and 1889.

During his time with the Railway Inspectorate of the Board of Trade, Rich investigated in excess of 250 accidents. Rich was "noted for the great attention he pays to all details" in his investigations.

In June 1865, Rich investigated an accident at Staplehurst, in which a South Eastern Railway Folkestone to London boat train derailed while crossing a viaduct where a length of track had been removed during engineering works, killing ten passengers and injuring forty. The author Charles Dickens was travelling with Ellen Ternan and her mother on the train; they all survived the derailment. Dickens tended the victims, some of whom died while he was with them. The experience affected Dickens greatly; he lost his voice for two weeks and afterwards was nervous when travelling by train, using alternative means when available.

In October 1868, Rich reported on his investigation of the Abergele rail disaster in which 33 people were killed, making it at the time, the worst railway disaster in Britain.  The accident was caused when the Irish Mail train collided with runaway wagons at Llandulas near Abergele.

At Stairfoot in South Yorkshire on 12 December 1870, a rake of runaway goods wagons collided with a passenger train resulting in 15 deaths and 59 injuries. In his report into the accident, Rich found that the goods guard at Barnsley was gravely at fault for not ensuring the standing wagons were better secured. The layout of the yard was also criticized as there were no trap points to protect the running lines in the event of such a mishap.

The train crash at Norton Fitzwarren occurred on 11 November 1890, at Norton Fitzwarren station on the Great Western Railway, approximately two miles south-west of Taunton in Somerset.  A special boat train carrying passengers from Plymouth to Paddington collided with a goods train that was being shunted on the main line.  Ten passengers were killed, and eleven people (including the driver and fireman of the special train) were seriously injured. Rich recommended "that all stations where there is much shunting, or where stopping trains are liable to be set aside for fast trains to pass, should be provided with refuge sidings" to avoid similar accidents.

As well as investigating railway accidents, Rich also inspected new railway lines and other works prior to their opening. These included the Faringdon branch of the GWR (May 1864), the Sidmouth Railway (June 1874), the Ribblehead Viaduct (May 1876) and the Severn Tunnel (November 1886). He inspected the Rhondda and Swansea Bay Railway  Rhondda Tunnel in May 1890, prior to its planned official opening. He requested further brickwork to be installed. The contractors took six weeks and the Rhondda Tunnel opened on 2 July 1890 without any ceremony.

In September 1872, Rich investigated the explosion of a locomotive boiler at Bray in which the driver and firemen were killed.

List of major accidents investigated by F. H. Rich
Criteria for inclusion: Fatalities of 3 or more or injuries of 20 or more.

Wives and children
On 31 August 1848, he married  Elizabeth Bayard (1826–1885) in Delaware, US. She was the daughter of Richard Henry Bayard, US Senator and Chief Justice of Delaware. They had nine children, including:
Henry Bayard Rich (1849–1884), who played for the Royal Engineers in the 1872 FA Cup Final.
Frederick St. George Rich (1852–1927), who served in the Royal Navy between 1877 and 1910, retiring with the rank of Vice-Admiral.

Elizabeth Bayard Rich died on 20 October 1885. Frederick remarried in 1891 to Cecile d'Olier Gowan, who survived him, dying in Bournemouth on 15 December 1926.

Frederick Henry Rich died at Oareford, near Oare, Somerset, on 22 August 1904, leaving an estate of over £92,000.

References

1824 births
Engineers from County Limerick
1904 deaths
Royal Engineers officers
Bayard family
British railway inspectors